The Northern Ireland national under-16 schools football team (also known as Northern Ireland schoolboys, under-16s or U16) represents Northern Ireland in association football at under-16 level. It is controlled by the Northern Ireland Schools Football Association (NISFA) which is affiliated to the Irish Football Association. The main competition competed for by the team is the Victory Shield which has been competed for since 1925 by the same four teams (England, Northern Ireland, Scotland and Wales). The Northern Ireland under-16 side also competes regularly in other minor tournaments and in friendlies. The team had previously been fielded at under-15 level and games are still sometimes arranged at this age group level with the agreement of the opposition association.

Honours
 European Schools Champions: 1979
 Victory Shield Winners: 2000

Coaches

Current squad
 The following players were called up for the Victory Shield.
 Match dates: 30 October–4 November 2022
 Opposition: ,  and Caps and goals correct as of:''' 4 November 2022, after the match against

See also
 Northern Ireland national football team
 Northern Ireland national under-17 football team

References

External links
NISFA
NISFA Records
Fixtures & Results
Current squad

Under 16s
European national under-16 association football teams
Youth association football in Northern Ireland